Bless This House is a 1972 British comedy film directed by Gerald Thomas starring Sid James, Diana Coupland, Terry Scott, June Whitfield and Peter Butterworth. It is a spin-off from the television sitcom Bless This House.

Plot
In contemporary suburbia, somewhere in southern England, middle-aged home-owner Sid Abbot (Sid James) just wants to lie on his settee and snooze. He is initially frustrated by his wife, work-shy son, and fashion-conscious daughter.

Their next door neighbour, Mr Hobbs, puts his house up for sale. The rude and arrogant Ronald Baines (Terry Scott) and his family move in next door and things worsen.

Sid works as a rep and is trying to sell to the Fizzo Drinks company when his daughter Sally arrives with a group of environmentalists to protest the use of non-disposable containers. Meanwhile Kate, Ronald's daughter, starts working next to Mike, Sid's son, and a romance begins to blossom. He drives her home in his psychedelic Morris Minor.

Sid buys a garden shed and sits drinking there with his friend Trevor (Peter Butterworth). They find a book about distilling and decide to create an illegal still in the shed. Sid tells his wife it is for making wine. In fact they are distilling home made rhubarb wine to create brandy. As Ronald is a customs and excise officer this does not bode well.

Mike and Kate get engaged and the wedding day arrives. On the wedding day a fire starts in the shed. Ronald and Sid put the fire out and miss the wedding. A fire engine gives them a lift to the church in time for the photos.

Despite Mike getting married at the end of the film, he is still single when the tv series returned.

Cast
The film starred many of the main actors from the TV series but some were replaced; most notably Robin Stewart, who was replaced by Robin Askwith because he had already been booked for the summer season on Bournemouth Pier and could not also appear in the film; though Stewart would return for the remainder of the six series. Another change was the role of Trevor Lewis, played in the film by Peter Butterworth and on television by Anthony Jackson.

Sid James as Sid Abbot
Diana Coupland as Jean Abbot
Terry Scott as Ronald Baines
June Whitfield as Vera Baines
Peter Butterworth as Trevor Lewis
Sally Geeson as Sally Abbot 
Robin Askwith as Mike Abbot 
Patsy Rowlands as Betty Lewis
Carol Hawkins as Kate Baines 
Janet Brown as Annie Hobbs 
Julian Orchard as Tom Hobbs 
Tommy Godfrey as Alf Murray
George A. Cooper as the cafe owner
Bill Maynard as Oldham 
Marianne Stone as Muriel
Wendy Richard as Carol 
Patricia Franklin as Mary 
Molly Weir as Mary's Mother
Ed Devereaux as Jim 
Johnny Briggs as Truck Driver 
Frank Thornton as Mr Jones 
Norman Mitchell as Police Sergeant
Brian Osborne as Removal Van Driver
Margaret Lacey as Vicar's Wife
Georgina Moon as Moira
Michael Nightingale as Vicar

June Whitfield and Terry Scott would play a couple two years later in Happy Ever After and the follow up Terry and June.

Filming and locations
 Filming dates – 19 June–1 August 1972

Exteriors:
 The exterior shots of the houses were filmed at numbers 7 and 9, Bolton Avenue, Windsor.
 Several exterior scenes were shot in Burnham,  a village in Buckinghamshire, including St Peter's Church (wedding scene), Church Street (magistrates court/pub scene) and the High Street (fire engine scene).

Interiors:
 Pinewood Studios, Buckinghamshire

References

External links

1972 comedy films
1972 films
British comedy films
1970s English-language films
Films based on television series
Films directed by Gerald Thomas
Films produced by Peter Rogers
Films shot at Pinewood Studios
Films set in London
Films shot in Berkshire
1970s British films